Ismael Sauce (born 6 November 1951) is a Venezuelan former tennis player.

Born in Caracas, Sauce represented Venezuela at the 1975 Pan American Games and in two editions of the Bolivarian Games. He was a men's doubles gold medalist at the 1978 Central American and Caribbean Games, partnering Juan Bóveda.

In 1981 he competed in his two career Davis Cup ties for Venezuela. He debuted in the America Zone semi-final against the Caribbean, winning a doubles rubber, then played doubles and reverse singles in the final against Colombia, losing both rubbers.

References

External links
 
 
 

1951 births
Living people
Venezuelan male tennis players
Tennis players from Caracas
Tennis players at the 1975 Pan American Games
Pan American Games competitors for Venezuela
Central American and Caribbean Games medalists in tennis
Central American and Caribbean Games gold medalists for Venezuela
Competitors at the 1978 Central American and Caribbean Games
20th-century Venezuelan people
21st-century Venezuelan people